ECAS may refer to:
 ECAS Theater, in Providence, Rhode Island
 Edmonton Contemporary Artists' Society
 Eight-Color Asteroid Survey
 Emergency Committee of Atomic Scientists
 European Citizen Advice Service
 European Cardiac Arrhythmia Society

See also 
 ECA (disambiguation)